Wannian Bridge, may refer to:

Wannian Bridge (Nancheng County), in Nancheng County, Jiangxi, China.

Wannian Bridge (She County), in She County, Anhui, China.